The Connection is a 2014 action crime thriller film directed by Cédric Jimenez and produced by Alain Goldman. The film was inspired by the events of the French Connection in the 1970s, starring Jean Dujardin as police magistrate Pierre Michel (juge) and Gilles Lellouche as Gaëtan "Tany" Zampa, a drug gang ringleader. The film premiered at the Toronto International Film Festival on 10 September 2014.

Plot 
1970s Marseilles is ruled by a brutal drug gang importing morphine from Turkey, transforming it into heroin and exporting the product to New York under the gang name la French. The gang, led by the cold-hearted Gaètan Tany Zampa (Gilles Lellouche), is boosting its income from drug trafficking by doing extortion and robberies. Former Juvenile Court judge Pierre Michel (Jean Dujardin) is transferred to an organized crime unit, but finds out that la French's crimes are difficult or impossible to prove and that the police unit investigating heroin trade under Captain Aimé-Blanc has nothing relevant to report.

Following a tip given by one of Michel's informants, the heroin-addicted teenager Lily, they arrest Charles Peretti, an old Corsican chemist who formerly produced heroin for la French. After he refuses to give information about the gang and its leader, preferring to spend the rest of his life in prison rather than risk his life by collaborating with police, the gang murders Lily and her friend, Fabrizio Mandonato, Peretti's nephew. Enraged by Tany killing his informers and because he can find out nothing relevant about the gang, Michel orders all lower cadres of la French arrested, "cutting the octopus' arms". Feeling menaced by the aggressive behaviour of the new judge, one of Tany's lieutenants, "Le Fou", breaks with the gang leader. While trying to take over Zampa's criminal business, Le Fou is shot and wounded by Zampa and his men, but escapes from hospital and begins a bloody feud, killing two of the gang's leaders, Franky and Robert, both close friends of Tany. Enraged and grieving, Tany retaliates by brutally killing Le Fou's girlfriend and numerous innocent bystanders. Fearing the criminal feud will take more lives and appealing to the procurator, Michel manages to get illegal surveillance on all the criminals involved in the feud, successfully avoiding the confrontation between Tany and Le Fou and arresting Le Fou.

Michel suffers an emotional breakdown, caused by his heavy workload and his feelings of helplessness. Michel then has to deal with his wife's gradual abandonment of him. While surveilling one of Marseille's casinos controlled by the gang, Michel has a short look in a side room and sees one of the leading figures of the narcotics squad, police veteran Ange Mariette, chatting with Zampa. Pressing the younger cop Alvarez, Michel finds out that Mariette is the leader of a large gang of corrupt Corsican police officers. Mariette and many other officers in the police narcotics team are on Zampa's payroll and tip him off about police investigations. With help from the DEA, Michel gets an associate of Zampa to turn state's witness. Michel is assassinated for his efforts against la French, but Zampa is finally arrested. Afterward, Michel is publicly touted as a hero for his work against drug trafficking.

Cast 

 Jean Dujardin as Pierre Michel 
 Gilles Lellouche as Gaëtan "Tany" Zampa
 Céline Sallette as Jacqueline Michel 
 Mélanie Doutey as Christiane Zampa 
 Guillaume Gouix as José Alvarez 
 Benoît Magimel as Le Fou 
 Bruno Todeschini as Le Banquier 
 Moussa Maaskri as Franky Manzoni 
 Féodor Atkine as Gaston Defferre
 Myriem Akheddiou as Melle Aissani
 Eric Godon as Zampa's lawyer
 Pauline Burlet as Lily
 Pierre Lopez as Jean Paci 
  as Robert 
  as Marco Da Costa 
 Jean-Pierre Sanchez as Fabrizio Mandonato 
  as Charles Peretti
 Bernard Blancan as Lucien Aimé-Blanc
  as Ange Mariette
 Patrick Descamps as The prosecutor

Reception
The Connection received generally positive reviews. The review aggregator website Rotten Tomatoes reports a 75% approval rating with an average rating of 6.5/10 based on 69 reviews. The website's consensus reads, "The Connection doesn't do itself any favors by forcing comparisons to The French Connection, but it's a reasonably entertaining thriller in its own right." On Metacritic, it has a score of 67 out of 100 based on 18 reviews, indicating "generally favorable reviews".

Reviewer Rudolph Herzog from Newsweek stated that the film, "[s]et in the 1970s,...captures the gutter charm of a town [Marseilles] that was never cleaned up and is as poisonous as it is attractive." Film critic Liam Lacey 
from the Canadian national newspaper The Globe and Mail called the film a "...byzantine, if ultimately conventional, heroic tale that feels like a guided tour down a familiar alley", giving the movie a 2.5/4 score.

Reviewer Ty Burr from the Boston Globe called the film "...a stylish affair, very solidly made if not exactly breaking new ground in our understanding of events or in the way the movies depict them" and gave it a 2.5/4 score. Critic Bill Goodykoontz from the Arizona Republic stated while that the film "...may prove too slow for some and the meandering can be a little maddening,... overall it's worth the effort. Goodykoontz gave the film a 3.5/5 score. Film critic Soren Anderson from the Seattle Times stated that the film "...starts with gunshots - a Mercedes and its driver are riddled by motorcycle-riding assassins in broad daylight - and the pace of "The Connection" is bang-bang brisk most of the rest of the way"; he gave the film a 3/4 score.

Colin Covert from the Minneapolis Star Tribune stated that while the "...story lacks focus here and there, the film never feels overplayed. It's a work of bloody style and solid substance"; Covert gave the movie a 3.5/4 score. Critic Stephanie Merry from the Washington Post stated that the film "...isn't all that different from a lot of police procedurals that have come before, but there's something about this particular gritty true-crime story that still fascinates all these years later"; Merry gave the film a 3/4 score.

Reviewer Tom Long from the Detroit News gave a negative review of the film, writing that "[g]angster movies should not [just] be mildly interesting", which is how he found the movie; Long gave the film a C−. Mick LaSalle from the San Francisco Chronicle called the film "[r]iveting from its first moments,...fascinating in its presentation of character, as well as for its glimpse into the workings of an international drug empire and into the ways an imaginative cop found to chip at its power"; LaSalle gave the movie a 4/4 score. Film critic Cary Darling from the Fort Worth Star-Telegram stated that while "...[t]here are no elaborate car chases or dizzyingly choreographed shootouts[,]...it's nonetheless a compelling portrait of two men in a specific time and place"; Darling gave the movie a score of 4/5.

Critic Tom Huddleston from Time Out noted the film's "...schnozz-tacular array of craggy-faced macho men" and gave the film a score of 3/5. Peter Rainer from the Christian Science Monitor stated that the film suffers from a "...common problem in crime-centric movies: The bad guys are almost always more fascinating than the good guys... Dujardin's bull-necked, hard-charging performance makes Pierre a worthy adversary"; Rainer gave the movie a B score. Chris Nashawaty from Entertainment Weekly stated that the "...sprawling cat-and-mouse thriller loses momentum and focus in the homestretch, but until then its '70s sun-and-sin-on-the-Côte d'Azur vibe is electric"; Nashawaty gave the movie a B+. Robert Abele from the Los Angeles Times stated that "[d]espite the pedestrian screenplay (by Jimenez and Audrey Diwan), Dujardin and Lellouche are magnetic performers who slip easily into their antagonistic roles."  Jeannette Catsoulis from the New York Times stated that "How can you dislike a film that signals a killing with "Bang Bang" and a villain with "The Snake"?"

Mike D'Angelo from The A.V. Club states that "Jimenez, making his second feature, fails to provide the regular jolts of electricity this material needs"; D'Angelo gave the film a C+. Alan Scherstuhl from the Village Voice stated that the film is "...engaging, propulsive, cut with rare brio, chockablock with consummate tough-guy business." Peter Debruge from Variety states that "Jimenez adopts a vintage-kitsch sensibility, taking a disappointingly generic approach to his hard-to-follow narrative." John DeFore from The Hollywood Reporter calls the film a "...procedural epic whose complicated narrative is propelled by visceral action sequences and an unusually thrilling soundtrack."

Awards & nominations

References

External links 
 
 

2014 films
2010s French-language films
French crime action films
French crime thriller films
French action thriller films
2014 action thriller films
2014 crime thriller films
2014 crime action films
Films about the French Connection
Films directed by Cédric Jimenez
Gaumont Film Company films
Films set in Marseille
Films set in the 1970s
2010s French films
Heroin in popular culture